This is a list of the different responsibilities in the water supply and sanitation sector in several Latin American and Caribbean countries. It includes the responsible institutions which set sector policies, agencies of economic regulation and service providers in urban and rural areas. The list can only give a simplified description in many cases due to overlapping responsibilities and/or unclear definitions. For more information on water supply and sanitation in each country, please click the respective country link.

See also 
 Water supply and sanitation in Latin America

Water management authorities
Latin America and the Caribbean
Latin America-related lists
Caribbean-related lists
Latin America and the Caribbean